Jay Wheals (born 18 March 1978) is a British auto racing driver who raced in the British Touring Car Championship (BTCC).

Racing career
He started racing in 1996, in the BRSCC Formula First Championship. After racing in the 1997 Formula Vauxhall Championship, he switched to GT racing in the Marcos Mantis Challenge in 1999. In 2001 he raced a Proton Coupe in the Super Coupe Cup. This was followed in 2002 and 2003  with a drive in the Radical Biduro Championship.

In 2003 he stepped up to the BTCC, driving a part season in the final year of the Production Class in a Peugeot 306, finishing ninth in class. In 2004 he drove in the BTCC again, taking over from Richard Marsh for the final three rounds at Donington Park in a Honda Civic Type R for Team Varta/Quest.

He went back to GT racing in 2005, in Britcar. he drove a Marcos LM600 for DJR Motorsport, and again in 2007.

Racing record

Complete British Touring Car Championship results
(key) (Races in bold indicate pole position - 1 point awarded in first race, 2003 in class) (Races in italics indicate fastest lap - 1 point awarded all races, 2003 in class) (* signifies that driver lead race for at least one lap - 1 point awarded all races)

References 

1978 births
Living people
British Touring Car Championship drivers
English racing drivers